Veronica ponae is a flowering plant belonging to the family Plantaginaceae.

Distribution

Description
These small perennial, herbaceous plants are creeping and pubescent, with ascending, simple stems. Leaves are oblong, lanceolate to oval, opposite, sessile and strongly serrated. Flowers are small, blue or purple lilac, in elongated terminal clusters. They bloom from June to September.

Gallery

References

ponae